Cor Zegger (11 March 1897 – 5 January 1961) was a Dutch swimmer. He competed in the men's 1500 metre freestyle event at the 1920 Summer Olympics.

References

External links
 

1897 births
1961 deaths
Olympic swimmers of the Netherlands
Swimmers at the 1920 Summer Olympics
Swimmers from Amsterdam
Dutch male freestyle swimmers